Fucoidanase (alpha-L-fucosidase, poly(1,2-alpha-L-fucoside-4-sulfate) glycanohydrolase) is an enzyme with systematic name poly((1->2)-alpha-L-fucoside-4-sulfate) glycanohydrolase. This enzyme catalyses the following chemical reaction

 Endohydrolysis of (1->2)-alpha-L-fucoside linkages in fucoidan without release of sulfate

References

External links 
 

EC 3.2.1